The men's competition in the middle-heavyweight (– 94 kg) division was held on 24 and 25 September 2010.

Schedule

Medalists

Records

Results

References
Pages 36–37 

- Mens 94 kg, 2010 World Weightlifting Championships